is a Japanese actress, author, and singer.

Biography 
Osawa was born in Hokkaidō, Japan. Her career began as a singer after she won the Grand Prix at the 7th HoriPro Talent Scout Caravan, a contest that searches for the next big talent in Japan. She released her first single  in 1983. In the same year, her father died. Her mother was also in poor health and became her mother's primary caretaker until her death. Her novel  details her experiences with her mother and Japan's healthcare system. She has also given lectures on the subject.

Selected filmography

Television
Aoi hitomi no seiraifu (1984)
Janpuappu! Seishun (1986) 
Jû yon sai no haha (2006)
Uruwashiki oni (2007)
 Mr. Brain (2009)
Kamen Rider W (2010)

Film
Jorôgumo (1995)
Lustful Revenge (1996)
School Days with a Pig (2008)
Gakudori (2011)

Bibliography
Okāsan gomenne (Mom, I'm sorry, 2003) 
Serafimu no yoru

Awards
8th Nippon Television Music Festival, Newcomer Award
14th Japan Music Awards, Newcomer Award
25th Japan Record Awards, Newcomer Award
16th Shinjuku Music Festival, Silver Award
10th FNS Music Festival, Rookie Award

References

External links
Profile at Horipro Square 

Japanese actresses
1966 births
Living people
Musicians from Sapporo